Zona J is a 1998 Portuguese film, directed by Leonel Vieira.

In 1999, it won 2 Globos de Ouro awards – an event organized by SIC, which was also one of the production companies behind the film.

External links
 

1998 films
1990s Portuguese-language films
1998 crime drama films
1998 romantic drama films
Golden Globes (Portugal) winners
Portuguese romantic drama films